Oona is a feminine given name. It is an Anglicisation of the Irish-language name Úna. Apart from in Ireland, it is also a popular name in Finland.

People with the name

Oona
Oona Brown (born 2004), American ice dancer
Oona Chaplin (born 1986), Spanish actress and dancer
 (born 1986), British dancer and choreographer
Oona Garthwaite (born 1982), American singer-songwriter
Oona A. Hathaway (born 1972), American law professor
Oona Hart, American model and actress
Oona King (born 1967), British politician
Oona Laurence (born 2002), American actress
Oona Louhivaara (born 1987), Finnish actress
Oona O'Neill (1925–1991), wife of Charlie Chaplin
Oona Sormunen (born 1989), Finnish athlete

Oonagh
Oonagh Guinness (1910 – 1995), Anglo-Irish socialite, society hostess and art collector
Oonagh McDonald, businesswoman
Senta-Sofia Delliponti, known by the stage name Oonagh, German singer

Fictional people with the name
 Princess Oona, a character in Disney's Donald Duck comics
 Oonagh Mullarkey, from the Marvel universe
 Princess Oona, a mermaid in Disney's Sofia the First cartoon
 Queen Oona, a character in Disenchantment
 Oona, the protagonist of the Irish TV series Puffin Rock
 Oona from Nick Jr.'s animated TV series Bubble Guppies
 Oona, Queen of the Fae, from the Shadowmoor block of collectible card game Magic: The Gathering 
 Agent Oona, a main character in season two of the PBS Kids show Odd Squad. 
 Oona, a character in the movie Timer
 Oona, the pixie in the movie Legend
 Oona (or Oonagh), wife of Finvarra or Fionn mac Cumhaill and queen of the fairies in the mythology of Ireland, Scotland, and the Isle of Man
 Fairy Queen in Irish folklore
 Two characters in Michael Moorcock's fantasy novels, Oona von Bek, the daughter of Elric of Melnibone and Oonagh von Bek, Elric's granddaughter
 Oona, the mother of the protagonist in The Flight Before Christmas (2008)
 Lady Una, a fairy character in Neil Gaiman's Stardust. 
 Lady Oonagh, a bad stepmother character in Juliet Marillier's Daughter of the Forest, (Part I of the Sevenwaters Series)
 Oonagh O'Dwyer, an Irish woman who first appears in Dorothy Dunnett's historical novel Queen's Play (1964), second of the Lymond Chronicles.

See also
List of Irish-language given names

References

English-language feminine given names
Irish feminine given names